El Rosario is a city and its surrounding municipality in the Mexican state of Sinaloa.

The city reported 16,001 inhabitants in the 2010 census.

Overview
The altar alone makes a visit to El Rosario somewhat worth the drive. El Rosario was once the richest town in Nouthwest Mexico because of the local mining operations. This small town was the home of the famous Mexican singer, Lola Beltrán. They have built a small museum in her honor although the museum is open only sporadically. The local economy produces pottery, furniture, and leather goods.

The city was founded on August 3, 1655. It is said that on that day a corporal named Bonifacio was looking for missing cattle. He walked along a river in what is now known as Loma de Santiago, from where the cattle was lost. He went for it and captured it. As it had turned to night he lit a fire. When he woke up he was in for a major surprise, under the ashes of the fire he saw large molten silver adhered to a rock. He then gave the news to his boss. But before he left to give the news he left a Rosario to mark the place. His boss ran to the location to confirm that it was silver and began to extract the silver.

Cultural references
Rosario Sinaloa is the town referred to as Tres Camarones in the writing of Luis Alberto Urrea.
The area now is known for growing amapola and marijuana in the hillsides, considered now the new gold mines for the area.

References

External links
 Unofficial Lola Beltran Resource page about the most famous person from Rosario

Populated places in Sinaloa
Pueblos Mágicos
Populated places established in 1655
1655 establishments in New Spain